Karchyoy is a rural locality (a village) in Chazyovskoye Rural Settlement, Kosinsky District, Perm Krai, Russia. The population was 11 as of 2010. There is 1 street.

Geography 
Karchyoy is located 39 km west of Kosa (the district's administrative centre) by road. Peklayb is the nearest rural locality.

References 

Rural localities in Kosinsky District